Tris's Book, a fantasy novel by Tamora Pierce, tells the story of four young mages as they battle pirates and become closer than ever.

Plot introduction

Lady Sandrilene fa Toren, Trisana Chandler, Daja Kisubo, and Briar Moss have been living in Discipline Cottage at Winding Circle a Temple in Emelan for some time now. They have survived an earthquake and are now having to defend their only true home from pirates using their magic and the help of their teachers.

Plot summary

As the book begins and progresses, Tris hears voices on the wind telling her seemingly useless bits of information. In an effort to cool herself off in the summer's cruel heat, she and her three "mates"—Sandry, Daja, and Briar—head up to the wall that encloses Winding Circle. On the wall, Tris hears more voices and then suddenly a lighthouse nearby blows up. As Tris and her teacher Niklaren Goldeye examine the ruins, they realize that the tower was blown up by a new substance they have never heard of. In the ruins, Tris finds a baby starling, which she decides to take care of.

While repairing a magical net protecting Winding Circle with Dedicate Frostpine and his apprentice Kirel, Daja sees a magically hidden boat out of the corner of her eye. While eating a turnover from Dedicate Gorse's kitchen's, Briar smells the unmistakable scent of cinnamon and poppy, a sure sign of someone invisible. A forgetful novice realizes that there are a lack of bandages, so Dedicate Lark and Sandry are forced to make some more. The Temple is short on medicine, so Dedicate Rosethorn and Briar are forced to make more. All the signs lead to trouble. When Daja finally tells Frostpine about the ship, he immediately tells Dedicate Superior Moonstream, who sends word to Duke Vedris IV, Sandry's uncle and the ruler of Emelan. Pirates are afoot.

Tris's cousin Aymery Glassfire comes to bring Niko a letter, and is recognized by her. He tries to get Tris to go home, saying her father is ill, but she refuses, saying that if he wanted her, he would send for her. While everyone is talking, a novice comes and tells Niko that every mirror, crystal, and vision bowl has been broken. That leaves Winding Circle blind to the future. Early the next morning, when jumping into a wind magically, Tris realizes that there is a huge invisible magic box coming slowly toward Winding Circle. Later in the morning, Frostpine takes Daja to repair two chains that protect Winding Circle. During the repairs, the pirates begin their attack.

As the attack goes on, the four start to help. Tris takes one of the pirate's "boomstones"—a hard sphere containing gunpowder—with her winds and sends it away. Briar and Rosethorn take seeds of thorny plants and grow them quickly and thickly along the cove to capture and kill the pirates. When all the adults leave to help defend Winding Circle, Tris practices zapping targets with her lightning and the help of Sandry, Daja, and Tris. Tris tests herself when a boomstone begins a descent on Discipline and blows it up.

When looking through Aymery's belongings, Briar finds that even though he claims he's staying for several weeks, Aymery has only brought a very small wardrobe. In a locked trunk, Briar finds cinnamon oil and poppy, used for invisibility. He also finds a mirror, when all of the mirrors in Winding Circle had broken the night before. When following Aymery out of Discipline at midnight, Tris and Briar confront him, whereupon he reveals that he had been working for Enahar, the pirates' chief mage, for some time. Then Aymery lets in the pirates through a side gate. Sandry, Daja, Lark, and Niko come and deal with the pirates, and Tris takes the dying Aymery's earring that links him to Enahar.

Maddened by helplessness, Tris goes up on the south wall to deal with the pirates herself and get them away from the one place she can call home and Sandry, Daja, and Briar join her and help. They bash through the pirates' barrier by pulling their strength together. Daja finds all the metal in the pirates' fleet like nails and weapons, pulls it out, and drops it in the water. Tris uses her lightning to blast ships. The four start destroying the fleet when they are all caught in mage traps on the ships. They appear to be lost when Niko returns their string of combined magic. With the extra power of the string and their arrived teachers, they destroy the rest of the fleet. Enahar attempts to capture Tris using his link with Aymery's earring, but Sandry, Daja, and Briar realize this and use stray lightning on Tris's hair to destroy the small piece of jewellery.

Because she killed and injured many of the helpless slaves on the pirate ships, Tris decides to help with the wounded pirates and slaves. She gets little thanks. All she cares about is trying to make up for some of the harm she did to so many people with her lightning.

Characters

 Trisana Chandler – merchant girl with ambient weather magic
 Lady Sandrilene fa Toren – noble girl with ambient thread magic
 Daja Kisubo – Trader trangshi girl with ambient smithing magic
 Briar Moss – former street thief with ambient plant magic
 Dedicate Lark – kind thread mage at Discipline who teaches Sandry
 Niklaren Goldeye – powerful seer mage who found the four and teaches Tris
 Dedicate Rosethorn – sharp plant mage at Discipline who teaches Briar
 Dedicate Frostpine – smith mage who teaches Daja
 Dedicate Gorse – cook mage who is the head of Winding Circle's kitchens
 Dedicate Crane – rival plant mage of Rosethorn's at Winding Circle
 Dedicate Superior Moonstream – head of the mages at Winding Circle
 Dedicate Skyfire – first dedicate of the fire temple and Winding Circle's chief defender
 Aymery Glassfire – Tris's cousin under of the power of the pirates. Briar is the one who first suspects him
 Duke Vedris IV – ruler of Emelan and Sandry's great-uncle
 Kirel – Frostpine's apprentice and the fours' friend
 Little Bear – dog staying at Discipline belonging to the four
 Shriek – orphan starling nestling that Tris takes care of

See also

Briar Moss
Daja Kisubo
Sandrilene fa Toren
Sandry's Book
Shatterglass
Tamora Pierce
The Circle of Magic
The Circle Opens
The Will of the Empress
Trisana Chandler

References

External links
 http://www.tamora-pierce.com

American fantasy novels
1998 American novels
1998 fantasy novels
Emelanese books